"Doctor Who: Children in Need", also known as "Born Again", is a 7-minute mini-episode of the British science fiction television series Doctor Who. It was broadcast on BBC One as part of the 2005 appeal for the children's charity Children in Need on 18 November 2005.

Plot
Following on directly from the end of "The Parting of the Ways", the newly regenerated Tenth Doctor sets the TARDIS coordinates for the planet Barcelona (Tuesday, 6 p.m., October 5006) — where his predecessor had been planning to travel just before he regenerated – while Rose watches him suspiciously. He delightedly examines his new appearance (noting he has a slight weakness in his right wrist's dorsal tubercle, a full head of hair, sideburns, is slimmer, and has a mole between his shoulder blades), while asking her what she thinks of the way he looks.

Rose, confused and frightened, asks him who he is. When he tells her he is the Doctor, she does not believe him. Confused as to what she has just seen, she theorises that this stranger has replaced the Doctor by means of teleportation, or perhaps he is a Slitheen. She demands that he bring the Doctor back, and the Doctor tries to reassure her that it is him, telling her how they first met in the cellar at Henrik's, and the first word he ever said to her was "run".

Rose starts to believe him, and the Doctor leaps around the console happily, reminiscing about their other adventures, such as when they once had to hop for their lives. However, she is still unsettled and asks him if he can change back to his previous self. A deflated Doctor replies that he cannot, and asks her if she wants to leave. When Rose hesitates in her answer, he resets the TARDIS' coordinates for her council estate on Christmas Eve, offering her the choice to stay with her mother, Jackie, or continue her travels with him.

Suddenly, the Doctor suffers a form of seizure, expelling glowing energy from his mouth, and the TARDIS shudders as if in sympathetic response. The Doctor tells Rose that the regeneration is going wrong and starts to act maniacally, throwing switches on the TARDIS console and ranting about increasing speed, as the sounds of the Cloister Bell start ringing through the console room. As Rose hangs on to the console for dear life, the TARDIS heads for a crash landing on Christmas Eve.

Production
The mini-episode was not broadcast with a title, but throughout the Children in Need appeal a preview banner for the segment called it The New Doctor. Russell T Davies joked in a Doctor Who Magazine article that it was called "Pudsey Cutaway"—after the Children in Need teddy-bear mascot and modifying "Dalek Cutaway", an alternative title for "Mission to the Unknown" (something of a one-off special itself, from the programme's earliest black-and-white era). The  2006 Doctor Who Magazine special Series Two Companion revealed that the title used on production papers was Doctor Who: Children in Need. The 2009 tie-in book Doctor Who: Companions And Allies attributes without source the title Born Again. However, DWM's review of the book indicates this to have been an error, and, as of 2011, Companions and Allies remains the only officially licensed publication to use this title.

Other specially made episodes of Doctor Who include Dimensions in Time (also for Children in Need) and Doctor Who and the Curse of Fatal Death (for Comic Relief), neither of which are usually considered canonical. The 20th-anniversary special, The Five Doctors (1983), was broadcast as part of that year's Children in Need night, but is considered canonical; the 2007 Children in Need mini-episode "Time Crash" is also considered canonical, as is the two-part mini-episode "Space" and "Time" produced for the 2011 edition of Comic Relief.

The mini-episode was written and recorded separately from both "The Parting of the Ways" and "The Christmas Invasion" and recorded after the latter had completed shooting. "The Christmas Invasion" does not reprise any of this episode (although the Doctor does mention having a mole between his shoulder blades in both the mini-episode and "The Christmas Invasion"). The online feed of the mini-episode ended with several pre-recorded inserts of Tennant and Piper appealing for donations to Children in Need. The appeals in which they both appear were light-hearted, with Piper claiming to be Tennant and vice versa in the first, and in the second the pair introducing themselves as Letitia Dean and Nicholas Lyndhurst. Russell T Davies stated in the book The Inside Story that he brokered an agreement with the BBC that there would be "... no banners along the bottom of the screen thanking people for sitting in bathtubs full of baked beans, and no Pudsey on the TARDIS console!"

The mini-episode ended with the text, "Doctor Who will return in THE CHRISTMAS INVASION", an announcement that also followed "The Parting of the Ways". It had no end credits, and so Tennant was neither listed as "Doctor Who" (as he had been in the credits of "The Parting of the Ways") nor as "The Doctor" (as he was in "The Christmas Invasion").
This special was never broadcast in Canada by the CBC which, at the time, were co-producers of the second series.

Broadcast and home media

According to the Broadcasters Audience Research Board (BARB), the overnight ratings suggest that 10.7 million viewers were tuned into BBC One from 9.00pm to 9.15pm (a 45.1% audience share), the slot in which the mini-episode was broadcast in most regions. This represented the highest ratings that Children in Need had received in eight years.

The mini-episode was included on the Series 2 DVD box set. The version of the special on the Region 2 DVD is slightly different: the opening montage to recap "The Parting of the Ways" has been changed, the Cloister Bell sound is missing, and there are variations in the incidental music throughout (including a rare use of part of the main theme as incidental, when the TARDIS changes course to Earth). This was later revealed to have been a 'rough-cut' version that was used by mistake and should never have been released, and the later Region 1 release features the broadcast version. The Region 1 DVD release marked the first time the special was officially seen in North America as it was never broadcast by either CBC or the Sci-Fi Channel.

In print
The storyline from this mini-episode was included in the novelisation of "The Christmas Invasion."

References

External links

Tenth Doctor episodes
Doctor Who charity episodes
Children in Need
2005 British television episodes
British television specials
Television shows written by Russell T Davies
2005 television specials
Doctor Who mini-episodes
Two-handers